"Dream Boy" is a song recorded by American rock band Beach Bunny. The song was released on October 31, 2019, as the lead single from the group's debut studio album Honeymoon.

Background
Trifilio had this to say about the song in a press release:

The song's music video was directed by Matt Gehl of Chicago-based filmmaking agency Everybody's Baby. Ben Kaye at Consequence of Sound described it as a combination of the work of John Hughes and the film Eighth Grade.

Reception
Writing for Consequence of Sound, Ben Kaye said the song "[oozes] with the optimism of a young romantic daydreamer, the track uses pounding percussion and breezily beatific guitar lines to push aside loneliness."

References

2019 singles
2019 songs
Beach Bunny (band) songs